Demetria may refer to:

 Alternative form of Demeter (Δημήτηρ), Greek goddess of harvest
 Demetria (bacteria), a genus of bacteria from the family Dermacoccaceae 
 Demetria (name), a feminine given name (and list of people with that name)
 Demetria, a fictional planet in the CrossGen comics Sigilverse

See also 
 Demetrias (disambiguation)
 Demetrius (disambiguation)
 Demeter (disambiguation)